The 15th Army Corps was an Army corps in the Imperial Russian Army.

Composition
6th Infantry Division
8th Infantry Division
6th Cavalry Division
15th Cavalry Division

Part of
2nd Army: 1914
10th Army: 1915
12th Army: 1915
3rd Army: 1915
4th Army: 1915–1916
2nd Army: 1916
1st Army: 1916–1917
3rd Army: 1917

Commanders  
 03.11.1893 — 14.11.1894 — Nikolai Stoletov

 28.12.1911 — 31.10.1914 — Nikolai Martos
 31.10.1914 — 16.01.1917 — Fjodor von Torklus
 16.01.1917 — 12.09.1917 — Ilia Odishelidze

External links
 Russian Army, 1914

Corps of the Russian Empire